The Battle of Punta Gruesa was a naval action that took place on May 21, 1879, during the War of the Pacific between Chile and Peru. This may be labelled as the second part of the Naval Battle of Iquique, although it is described in many sources as a separate battle.

History
During the first year of the war, Chilean war efforts were focused on destroying the Peruvian Navy, since the Chileans understood the strategic importance of sea domination. This was in order to enable the Chilean Navy to help the army to conquer Bolivian and Peruvian territories with troop landings and port blockades without interference.

During May 1879, the main ships of the Chilean Navy were sent towards the Peruvian port of Callao in order to destroy its navy, while two old, wooden ships, the corvette Esmeralda and the schooner Covadonga, commanded by Captain Arturo Prat and Captain Carlos Condell respectively, were left blockading the Peruvian port of Iquique.

However, as the Chilean Navy steamed north towards Callao, two ironclad ships of the Peruvian Navy steamed south from Callao, undetected. These ships were the monitor Huáscar and the armoured frigate Independencia, commanded by Captain Miguel Grau and Captain Juan Guillermo More.

History 
On the morning of May 21, 1879, the lookout of Esmeralda spotted two ships coming from the north. These were the Peruvian Independencia and Huáscar. Condell noticed the Independencia was moving separated from the Huascar, realizing their plan was to close both chilean ships in the port and attack from the distance, so he ordered to run south to keep both peruvian forces divided. The Covadonga headed south while the Esmeralda keept the defense at the port, as it had engine problems making her difficult to maneuver. The battle had begun: Huáscar engaged Esmeralda and Independencia pursued Covadonga south. Many sources (peruvian mostly) say Condell attempted to escape the Iquique battle, but that can't be the case as the Covadonga had half the speed than the Independencia, making it unlikely for the Covadonga to escape to Antofagasta. 

Captain Carlos Condell of the Covadonga realized that the quicker but heavier Independencia had a deeper draft than his schooner, the reason why he decided to run south very close to the coast, risking to run his ship aground. With Independencia in pursuit, both ships exchanged fire. The Independencia's lack of trained gunners and the Covadonga's accurate sniper fire prolonged the chase for over three hours. Chilean-Mapuche sniper Juan Bravo was hailed after the battle for taking down numerous Peruvians. Captain More of the Independencia, tired because of the prolongued pursuit, lost his temper and patience, deciding to take a riskier approach and ram the Chilean ship. Constantly sounding the depth, he attempted to do so twice, only to have to call off the attack when approaching the shallows. Close to Punta Gruesa, a shallow cove, Covadonga scraped and barely cleared a reef. The Independencia, attempting to ram for a third time, struck the obstacle and immediately took on water while listing to starboard. The Covadonga then turned around and opened fire, while Independencia'''s crew returned fire and tried to float her off the reef.

As Captain More realized his ship was lost, he ordered her scuttled, but the magazine was already flooded and it could not be blown up. The Covadonga kept firing, as the crew of the Independencia resisted to surrender. When they finally raised the white flag, Condell's men were preparing the boats to take prisoners, but then they saw the Huáscar coming from the north, so they decided to run south to Antofagasta. Huáscar's commander checked on Independencia and decided to pursue the enemy after seeing she was immobilized, but this cost precious time and Covadonga steamed south as fast as possible. Captain Grau realized that Huáscar could not catch up on the 10 mile head start before dusk, gave up the chase, and returned to assist Independencia and salvage her guns; the crew (those aboard and some who had escaped to the beach) were rescued and the ship set on fire.

The Peruvians lost 5 crew with 5 wounded; 3 Chilean crewmen were killed and 5 wounded.

 Aftermath 
The naval battle of Punta Gruesa was a Peruvian defeat. One of the most powerful warships in the Peruvian Navy was lost, while Chile only lost one of its oldest wooden warships.

 Commanders 

 Forces 

References

 Farcau, Bruce W. (Sep 30, 2000). The Ten Cents War: Chile, Peru, and Bolivia in the War of the Pacific, 1879-1884, 
 Sondhaus, Lawrence (May 4, 2004). Navies in Modern World History'',

See also
Battle of Iquique
Battle of Angamos

History of South America
Naval battles involving Chile
Naval battles involving Peru
Naval battles of the War of the Pacific
Conflicts in 1879
1879 in Chile
Battle of Punta Gruesa
May 1879 events

pl:Bitwa pod Iquique